Njegoševo is a village in Serbia. It is situated in the Bačka Topola municipality, in the North Bačka District, Vojvodina province. The village has a Serb ethnic majority and its population numbering 632 people (2002 census).

Name
In Serbian the village is known as Njegoševo (Његошево), in Hungarian as Istenáldás, and in Croatian as Njegoševo.

Historical population

1961: 1,090
1971: 923
1981: 752
1991: 635
2002: 632

References
Slobodan Ćurčić, Broj stanovnika Vojvodine, Novi Sad, 1996.

See also
 List of places in Serbia
 List of cities, towns and villages in Vojvodina

Places in Bačka
Petar II Petrović-Njegoš